The AMB-17 (awaiting GRAU designation), is an integrally suppressed assault rifle that uses a heavy subsonic 9×39mm SP5 cartridge and armor-piercing SP6 cartridge. It was developed and manufactured in the late 2010s by Kalashnikov Concern, based on the Yevgeny Dragunov MA Compact Rifle and unveiled at the Russian Army Expo 2017 alongside the AM-17. The weapon is intended for use as a close quarters weapon, primarily for special units of the Russian Interior Ministry and the Russian Army to replace the AS Val and VSS Vintorez firearms.

Design details

Operating mechanism
The AMB-17, unlike previous firearms in current use with the Russian military, differentiates itself by employing two receivers that connect on a hinge instead of a single stamped receiver with a lid. To do this, the upper receiver itself is made from polymer and steel reinforcements, while the lower receiver along with its magazine housing is made entirely from polymer, and connected to the upper receiver by two captive take down cross-pins, reducing the weight of the firearm significantly and allowing for easier access into the internal operation. The gas operated action uses a short stroke gas piston and rotary bolt which locks with three radial lugs on the bolt head, similar to previous 9x39mm carbines such as the VSK-94. The bolt carrier within the upper receiver is almost streamline by design raising it towards the bolt group reducing both bolt friction and felt user recoil.

Features
The weapon has an integral suppressor mounted on the front of the upper receiver which wraps around the barrel. In order for the suppressor to be integrated, the AMB-17 employs a wider opening within its handguard as compared to the AM-17, along with the front of the upper receiver which also allows for an integrated handguard half-length MIL-STD/1913 Picatinny rail.  The integrated upper also includes a full-length MIL-STD/1913 Picatinny railing, polymer side-folding and adjustable (telescoping) shoulder stock, and longitudinal slots in the walls of the upper receiver allowing for ambidextrous controls in both the fire selector and charging handle.

The firearm uses a subsonic 9×39 mm cartridge to avoid sonic boom with detachable box magazines compatible with AS VAL, VSS, and SR-3 (SR-3M, SR-3MP) and other 9x39mm rifle systems

Additionally, the bullet is very effective at penetrating body armor.

Users and service history
 : The AMB-17 is in limited use with FSB and FSO specifically for firearms testing and has yet to complete acceptance trials.

See also
AK-9
AM-17
List of Russian weaponry
List of equipment of the Russian Ground Forces

References

External links
 Larry Vickers shooting AM-17 assault rifle
 АМБ-17: ТТХ

Silenced firearms
9×39mm firearms
Assault rifles of Russia
Kalashnikov Concern products